Ken Ito may refer to:

 Ken Itō, Japanese composer, conductor and writer
 Ken Ito (politician) (born 1944), American politician in the Hawaii House of Representatives